Oscar Dean Wyatt High School is a secondary school in Fort Worth, Texas, United States.  The school is located at 2400 East Seminary Drive. The school is a part of the Fort Worth Independent School District.

The school serves sections of Fort Worth and the FWISD portion of Forest Hill.

History
The school was named after Oscar Dean Wyatt, a longtime principal of R. L. Paschal High School.

When the school opened, the student body chose its mascot, the chaparral, from Fort Worth's American Basketball League team, the Ft  Worth Chaparrals.

In 2019 some area residents of Rosemont, in the portion zoned to Paschal, protested when they found the FWISD planned to rezone them to South Hills High School.

1976 shooting
In 1976, student Ronald Allridge of O.D. Wyatt High School shot two fellow students; Lorenzo Kneeland, 15, was fatally shot, while James Christian, also 15, was shot and injured but survived. Ronald was arrested, and was sentenced to 10 years in prison as a juvenile. He was released in 1983. Ronald and his younger brother James later gained infamy for a series of violent holdups and murders in the Fort Worth area; January–March 1985.

Attendance zone

In 2019 a portion of Rosemont was zoned to Wyatt.

Athletics
O.D. Wyatt Chaparrals compete in the following sports in UIL Class 5A:
Football
Basketball (Boys & Girls)
Track & Field (Boys & Girls)
Baseball
Volleyball
Softball
Soccer
Tennis
Wrestling
Golf

References

External links

O. D. Wyatt High School

Public high schools in Fort Worth, Texas
Fort Worth Independent School District high schools